Bax is a small rural village and commune in the Haute-Garonne department in southwestern France.

Geography
The commune is bordered by six other communes: Latrape to the north, Canens to the east, Lapeyrère to the southeast, Latour to the south, Montesquieu-Volvestre to the west, and finally by Mailholas to the northwest.

Population

Its Inhabitants are called Baxéens

See also
Communes of the Haute-Garonne department

References

Communes of Haute-Garonne